Les Halles is a market area of Paris, France.

Les Halles may also refer to:

 Châtelet–Les Halles, a major train hub in Paris
 Les Halles (Paris Métro), a station on Line 4
 Les Halles, Rhône, a commune in France
 Brasserie Les Halles, a defunct restaurant with locations in New York and other cities

See also
 Les Halles D'Anjou, a shopping mall in Montreal, Quebec, Canada